Tyrosine N-monooxygenase (tyrosine N-hydroxylase, CYP79A1) is an enzyme with systematic name L-tyrosine,NADPH:oxygen oxidoreductase (N-hydroxylating). This enzyme catalyses the following chemical reaction

L-tyrosine + 2 O2 + 2 NADPH + 2 H+  (Z)-[4-hydroxyphenylacetaldehyde oxime] + 2 NADP+ + CO2 + 3 H2O (overall reaction)
(1a) L-tyrosine + O2 + NADPH + H+  N-hydroxy-L-tyrosine + NADP+ + H2O
(1b) N-hydroxy-L-tyrosine + O2 + NADPH + H+  N,N-dihydroxy-L-tyrosine + NADP+ + H2O
(1c) N,N-dihydroxy-L-tyrosine  (Z)-[4-hydroxyphenylacetaldehyde oxime] + CO2 + H2O

Tyrosine N-monooxygenase is heme-thiolate protein (P-450).

References

External links 
 

EC 1.14.13